"Still, still, still" is an Austrian Christmas carol and lullaby.

The melody is a folk tune from the district of Salzburg. The words describe the peace of the infant Jesus and his mother as the baby is sung to sleep. There are various English translations.

Lyrics
Still, still, still, weil 's Kindlein schlafen will.
Maria tut es niedersingen,
ihre keusche Brust darbringen.
Still, still, still, weil 's Kindlein schlafen will.

Schlaf, schlaf, schlaf, mein liebes Kindlein, schlaf!
Die Englein tun schön musizieren,
vor dem Kripplein jubilieren.
Schlaf, schlaf, schlaf, mein liebes Kindlein, schlaf!

Groß, groß, groß, die Lieb' ist übergroß.
Gott hat den Himmelsthron verlassen
und muss reisen auf den Straßen.
Groß, groß, groß, die Lieb' ist übergroß.

Auf, auf, auf, ihr Adamskinder auf!
Fallet Jesum all' zu Füßen,
weil er für uns d'Sünd tut büßen!
Auf, auf, auf, ihr Adamskinder auf!

Wir, wir, wir, wir rufen all' zu dir:
Tu uns des Himmels Reich aufschließen,
wenn wir einmal sterben müssen.
Wir, wir, wir, wir rufen all' zu dir.
Still, still, still, He sleeps this night so chill.
The Virgin's tender arms enfolding,
Warm and safe the Child are holding.
Still, still, still, He sleeps this night so chill.

Sleep, sleep, sleep, He lies in slumber deep.
While angel hosts from heav'n come winging,
Sweetest songs of joy are singing.
Sleep, sleep, sleep, He lies in slumber deep.

Melody

See also
 List of Christmas carols

References

External links

 , Nana Mouskouri
 "Still, still, still", Hymns and Carols of Christmas
 Samples of available recordings of "Still, still, still", classicalarchives.com
 "Still, still, still, weil 's Kindlein schlafen will" – A German Christmas carol in German and English, german-way.com
 

German-language Christmas carols
Austrian songs